is a national highway of Japan that traverses the prefecture of Yamagata in a southeast–northwest routing. It connects the prefecture's capital city, Yamagata in eastern Yamagata Prefecture to the city of Sakata on the prefecture's western coast.

Route description

National Route 112 begins at a junction with National Route 13 and National Route 48 in Yamagata Prefecture's capital city, Yamagata in the eastern part of the prefecture. The highway passes through Yamagata's city center. A part of this National Route 112 in central Yamagata is closed to auto traffic during the annual Yamagata Hanagasa Festival and is utilized as a part of the primary venue for the festival. After passing through the capital city's central district, the highway curves to the northwest, passing through the town of Nakayama on the way to the city of Sagae. The highway bypasses the city's central district, traveling along the eastern and northern edge of the city. On the western fringe of Sagae the highway shares a brief concurrency with National Route 458. In the city of Tsuruoka, the highway shares concurrencies with National Route 345 and then National Route 7. After passing through the central district of Sakata, the highway ends at a junction with National Route 7 on the northern side of the city.

History
National Route 112 was established by the Cabinet of Japan on 18 May 1954 as Secondary National Route 112 between the cities of Yamagata and Tsuruoka. The highway was reclassified as General National Route 112 on 1 April 1965. On 1 April 1993, the highway's ending point was shifted from Tsuruoka to Sakata following an order from the Cabinet of Japan.

Major junctions
The route lies entirely within Yamagata Prefecture.

See also

References

External links

112
Roads in Yamagata Prefecture